Mustafa Cerić (born 5 February 1952) is a Bosnian imam who served as the Grand Mufti (Reis-ul-Ulema) of Bosnia and Herzegovina and is currently president of the World Bosniak Congress. He was also a candidate for a Bosniak member of the Presidency of Bosnia and Herzegovina at the 2014 general election.

Cerić ensured that Islam is a strong element of Bosniak nationalism and has argued that Bosnia and Herzegovina should become a Bosniak nation state as Croats and Serbs already have their own nation states, Croatia and Serbia.

Life

Cerić graduated from the Gazi Husrev-beg Madrasa in Sarajevo and received a scholarship to Al-Azhar University in Cairo, Egypt. He then returned to Yugoslavia, where he became an Imam. In 1981, he accepted the position of Imam at the Islamic Cultural Center of Greater Chicago (ICC) in Northbrook, Illinois and lived in the United States for several years.

During his time in the United States, he learned English and earned a Ph.D. degree in Islamic Studies at the University of Chicago. After his studies, he left the ICC and returned to Yugoslavia and became an Imam again in a learning center in Zagreb in 1987.

Cerić led the Islamic Community of Bosnia and Herzegovina since 1993. He officially became the Grand Mufti of Bosnia and Herzegovina in 1999. He was replaced as reis-ul-ulema in 2012 by Husein Kavazović. In 2011, Cerić was one of the founders of the Bosniak Academy of Sciences and Arts. In December 2012, Cerić was one of the founders of the World Bosniak Congress, and serves as its president.

Membership

He is one of the signatories of A Common Word Between Us and You, an open letter by Islamic scholars to Christian leaders, calling for peace and understanding. Cerić is also a member of the Committee of Conscience fighting against the Holocaust denial.

Awards
He was the co-recipient of the 2003 UNESCO Felix Houphouet-Boigny Peace Prize and recipient of the International Council of Christians and Jews Annual Sternberg Award “for exceptional contribution to interfaith understanding." He also received the 2007 Theodor-Heuss-Stiftung award for his contribution to spreading and strengthening democracy."

In 2007, he was named the recipient of the Lifetime Achievement Award by the Association of Muslim Social Scientists UK “in recognition of his distinguished contributions to better understanding between Faiths, outstanding scholarship, for promoting a climate of respect and peaceful co-existence, and a wider recognition of the place of faith in Europe and the West.”

He was a 2008 recipient of Eugen Biser Foundation award for his efforts in promoting understanding and peace between Islamic and Christian thought. In 2008, Cerić accepted the invitation of Tony Blair to be on the advisory council of the Tony Blair Faith Foundation.

Publications
"The challenge of a single Muslim authority in Europe" (December 2007), springerlink.com
Roots of Synthetic Theology in Islam
A Choice Between War and Peace
"A Declaration of European Muslims", rferl.org, 16 March 2006.

Personal life
Cerić is fluent in Bosnian, English and Arabic language, and cites a "passive knowledge" of Turkish, German and French language.

See also 
 Husein Kavazović

References

Other sources

External links

Full biography on the website of Faculty of islamic studies in Sarajevo, utic.net.ba (in Bosnian)
A Conversation with Dr Mustafa Ceric, angelfire.com
Qantara.de: Islam in Europe. “Bosnian Islam” as a Model?, 29 November 2007
Qantara.de: Bosnian Muslims in Germany. Everyday Euro-Islam, 11 May 2007
Qantara.de: A Dialogue of the Cultures Instead of the Clash of Civilisations, 17 March 2006
Qantara.de: Interview with Mustafa Ceric. “The West Does Not Want to Share Its Values”, 6 May 2004

|-

1952 births
Living people
People from Visoko
Bosniaks of Bosnia and Herzegovina
Bosnia and Herzegovina Sunni Muslims
Gazi Husrev Bey's Madrasa alumni
Al-Azhar University alumni
University of Chicago alumni
Grand Muftis of Bosnia and Herzegovina
Hanafis
Maturidis
20th-century imams
21st-century imams
Christian and Islamic interfaith dialogue